Namakkal is a neighbourhood in Namakkal district Tamil Nadu, India.

Namakkal may also refer to:
 Namakkal town
 Namakkal block
 Namakkal taluk 
 Namakkal district
 Namakkal (state assembly constituency) 
 Namakkal (Lok Sabha constituency)
 Namakkal Fort
 Namakkal railway station